Emmanuel Bibb (born February 25, 1973), also known as Hard Work, is an American streetball player from Detroit, Michigan.  He is 6-foot 2-inches tall and plays shooting guard.  In streetball, he is best known for his appearances on the AND1 Mixtape Tour, which airs on ESPN.

In conventional basketball, Bibb currently plays for the Detroit Panthers of the ABA.  Bibb played college basketball at the University of Detroit Mercy.  While in high school, playing for Detroit Denby, Bibb finished in 10th place for Michigan's High School Mr. Basketball award for 1991, placing behind future NBA players Chris Webber (winner), Jalen Rose (runner-up), and Voshon Lenard (7th place).

Bibb appears as a character in the video game AND 1 Streetball.

External links 
 Profile at USBasket.com

1973 births
Living people
AND1
Basketball players from Detroit
Detroit Mercy Titans men's basketball players
Fort Wayne Fury players
Street basketball players
Denby High School alumni
American men's basketball players